A head gardener is an individual who manages all horticultural aspects of a property or garden, including staff and volunteers. The properties they manage include historic gardens and private estates, as well as amenity horticulture teams, for example, with a county council. Except in recognised large organisations, the role of head gardener is often amalgamated with site maintenance manager, ranger, dog walker, horsesitter, chef, and other non-horticultural roles.

The remit of a head gardener, and the required experience varies between roles and properties, but head gardeners would normally be educated to an exceptionally high level within their field and have many years of experience to support that education. In the UK, Kew Gardens, Capel Manor College and other professional educational establishments run training courses with qualifications enabling the professional development of gardeners.

The Royal Horticultural Society is a one such leader in the provision of horticultural training with many professional gardeners securing diplomas and Master of Horticulture degrees under their training courses. The fundamental horticultural aspects of managing a garden include, and are not limited to, propagation, productive growing, commercial horticulture, landscaping — both hard and soft—, pest, disease and plant health management including a sound understanding of plant passport (import and export) regulations as well as a worldwide understanding of preventing the spread of invasive diseases, plants and pests. Managing a team of volunteers is often an aspect of this role within public gardens or charity spaces such as The National Trust or English Heritage.

See also
Bostanci-başi
Landscape manager
Museum of Garden History

External links
Careers leaflet .pdf
An English Head Gardener's Online Diary

Gardening
Building and grounds cleaning and maintenance occupations